Pallaviciniales is an order of liverworts.

Taxonomy
 Pallaviciniineae Schuster 1984
 Hymenophytaceae Schuster 1963
 Hymenophyton Dumortier 1835 [Umbraculum Gottsche 1861 non Schumacher 1817 non Kuntze 1891] 
 Moerckiaceae Stotler & Crandall-Stotler 2007
 Hattorianthus Schuster & Inoue 1975
 Moerckia Gottsche 1860 Blyttia Endlicher 1840 non Arnott 1838 non Fries 1839; Cordaea Nees 1833 non Sprengel 1831]
 Pallaviciniaceae Migula 1904
 Pallavicinioideae Migula ex Grolle
 Jensenia Lindberg 1867 [Mittenia Gottsche 1864 non Lindberg 1863; Makednothallus Verdoorn 1932]
 Pallavicinia Gray 1821 nom. cons. [Pallavicinius (sic); Dilaena Dumortier 1822; Diplolaena Dumortier 1831 non Brown 1814; Hollia Endlicher 1842 non Sieber 1826 non Heynhold 1846; Steetzia Lehmann 1846 non Sonder 1853; Thedenia Fries 1842 non Schimper 1852; Wuestneia Brockmüller 1863 non Auerswald ex Fuckel 1864]
 Podomitrium Mitten 1855
 Symphyogynoideae Schuster ex Grolle
 Greeneothallus Hässel 1980
 Seppeltia Grolle 1986
 Symphyogyna Nees & Montagne 1836 [Strozzia Trevisan 1877; Viviania Raddi 1822 non Cavanilles 1804 non Willd. ex Less. non Colla 1825 non Rafinesque 1814 non Rondani 1861; Viviana (sic) Raddi 1822 non (sic) Bigot 1888 non (sic) Colla non Koken 1896]
 Symphyogynopsis Grolle 1986
 Xenothallus Schuster 1963
 Sandeothallaceae Schuster 1984
 Sandeothallus Schuster 1982
 Phyllothalliineae Schuster 1967
 Phyllothalliaceae Hodgson 1964
 Phyllothallia Hodgson 1964

References

Pallaviciniales
Liverwort orders